Berberich is either a (primary Frankonian) habitational surname for a person from a place with the syllable "-ber-" and the ending "-berg" or an occupational name for a "barber" (from Turkish berber ("barber") via South Slavic Berberić) and may refer to:
Adolf Berberich (1861–1920), German astronomer 
August Berberich (1912–1982), German politician 
Monika Berberich (born 1942), convicted West German terrorist

References 

German-language surnames
Occupational surnames
Toponymic surnames